Rapini or broccoli rabe is a green cruciferous vegetable, with the leaves, buds, and stems all being edible; the buds somewhat resemble broccoli, but do not form a large head. Rapini is known for its bitter taste, and is particularly associated with Mediterranean cuisine.

Classification 
Native to Europe, the plant is a member of the tribe Brassiceae of the Brassicaceae (mustard family). Rapini is classified scientifically as Brassica rapa var. ruvo, or  Brassica rapa subsp. sylvestris var. esculenta. It is also known as broccoletti, broccoli raab, broccoli rabe, spring raab, and ruvo kale. Turnip and bok choy are different varieties (or subspecies) of this species.

Description 

Rapini has many spiked leaves that surround clusters of green buds that resemble small heads of broccoli.  Small, edible yellow flowers may be blooming among the buds. Rapini is a source of vitamins A, C, and K, as well as potassium, calcium, and iron.

Culinary use 

The flavor of rapini has been described as nutty, bitter, and pungent, as well as almond-flavored. Rapini needs little more than a trim at the base. The entire stalk is edible when young, but the base becomes more fibrous as the season advances.

Rapini is widely used in the cuisine of Rome as well Southern Italy, particularly in the regions of Sicily, Calabria, Campania, Apulia, In Italian, rapini is called cime di rapa or broccoletti di rapa; in Naples, the green is often called friarielli. Within Portuguese cuisine, grelos de nabo are similar in taste and texture to broccoli rabe. Rapini is also popular in the Galicia region of northwestern Spain; a rapini festival (Feira do grelo) is held in the Galician town of As Pontes every February.

Rapini may be sautéed or braised with olive oil and garlic, and sometimes chili pepper and anchovy. It may be used as an ingredient in soup, served with orecchiette, other pasta, or pan-fried sausage. Rapini is sometimes (but not always) blanched before being cooked further.

In the United States, rapini is popular in Italian-American kitchens; the D'Arrigo Brothers popularized the ingredient in the United States and gave it the name broccoli rabe. Broccoli rabe is a component of some hoagies and submarine sandwiches; in Philadelphia, a popular sandwich is Italian-style roast pork with locally-made sharp provolone cheese, broccoli rabe, and peppers. It can be a component of pasta dishes, especially when accompanied by Italian sausage.

See also 
 Gai lan
 Chinese cabbage
 Collard greens
 Mustard greens
 Rutabaga
 Turnip
 Brassica rapa

References

Further reading

External links 
 

Brassica
Leaf vegetables
Italian cuisine